Scruples is a synonym for conscience.

Scruple(s) may also refer to:
 Scruples (novel), by Judith Krantz, 1978
 Scruples (miniseries), 1980, based on the novel 
 Scruples (comic strip), by Joseph Young, Jr.
 Scruples (game), a card game based on ethical dilemmas.
 Scruple (unit) (℈), a small unit of mass in the apothecaries' system

See also 
 
 Skrupel, a Norwegian unit of length
 Scrupulosity
 Maigret Has Scruples, a 1958 novel